is a song by Japanese rock band Asian Kung-Fu Generation. The song was initially pre-released digitally on September 21, 2022, with the full single being released (digitally and physically) a week later on September 28, 2022. It is the opening theme to anime series The Tatami Time Machine Blues, a sequel to The Tatami Galaxy which the band also provided the opening theme for (Maigoinu to Ame no Beat).

The single also features a cover of Weezer's I Just Thew Out The Love Of My Dreams, sung with AAAMYYY from Tempalay. The other B-sides include a duet between Gotoh and Kita for Oppama Feelin' Down, and an alternate version of the A-side called Yanagikōji Parallel Universe. Yanagikōji Parallel Universe is a continuation of the band's previous album Surf Bungaku Kamakura, where each track is named after a station on the Enoshima Electric Railway.

It is the first single from the band to include three new songs as B-sides since Blue Train.

Music video 
The music video for "Demachiyanagi Parallel Universe" was directed by Yoshiyuki Shimada. The video begins with an animation of the song's lyrics with Gotoh singing along, before transitioning to the be in the same style of The Tatami Galaxy'''s (and Tatami Time Machine Blues) opening titles. The rest of the video features the band members inside the animated world of The Tatami Galaxy'' whilst dressed as characters from the anime.

Track listing

Charts

Release history

References 

Asian Kung-Fu Generation songs
2022 singles
Songs written by Masafumi Gotoh
2022 songs
Ki/oon Music singles